Eliška Staňková (born 11 November 1984 in Kraslice) is a Czech athlete specialising in the discus throw. She represented her country at four consecutive European Championships, her best placing being 10th in 2014.

Her personal best in the event is 60.48 metres set in Kolín in 2016.

International competitions

References

1984 births
Living people
Czech female discus throwers
People from Kraslice
Czech Athletics Championships winners
World Athletics Championships athletes for the Czech Republic
Competitors at the 2009 Summer Universiade
Sportspeople from the Karlovy Vary Region
20th-century Czech women
21st-century Czech women